Brian Edward Girling (born 14 May 1938) is a British former international sports shooter, who competed in an Olympics and four Commonwealth Games from 1966-1990.

Sports shooting career
He competed at the 1976 Summer Olympics

At the age of 28 he represented England in the rapid fire pistol and centre fire pistol events, at the 1966 British Empire and Commonwealth Games in Kingston, Jamaica.

Twelve years later he competed in the rapid fire pistol event again at the 1978 Commonwealth Games in Canada. It was not until 1986 that he finally won a medal and it was a gold medal in the 25 metres rapid fire pistol pairs, at the 1986 Commonwealth Games in Edinburgh, Scotland. He was selected for a fourth Games (aged 52); that of the 1990 Commonwealth Games in Auckland, New Zealand, where he won a bronze medal in the 25 metres rapid fire pistol pairs.

References

1938 births
Living people
Sportspeople from Birmingham, West Midlands
English male sport shooters
Olympic shooters of Great Britain
Shooters at the 1976 Summer Olympics
Shooters at the 1966 British Empire and Commonwealth Games
Shooters at the 1978 Commonwealth Games
Shooters at the 1986 Commonwealth Games
Shooters at the 1990 Commonwealth Games
Commonwealth Games gold medallists for England
Commonwealth Games bronze medallists for England
Commonwealth Games medallists in shooting
Medallists at the 1986 Commonwealth Games
Medallists at the 1990 Commonwealth Games